Jonas Arweiler (born 10 April 1997) is a German professional footballer who plays as a forward for Austrian Bundesliga club Austria Klagenfurt.

Club career

Borussia Dortmund II
Arweiler began playing football with 1. FC Riegelsberg and 1. FC Saarbrücken. Prior to the 2013–14 season he joined the under-17 team of Borussia Dortmund, and he was promoted to the under-19s the following season. While playing for the Dortmund youth teams, he competed in the UEFA Youth League. In March 2016, Arweiler made his first appearances for the reserves in the Regionalliga. From the 2016–17 season, he was a permanent member of the reserve team. In the 2016–17 season, he made 30 appearances in which he scored five goals. In the 2017–18 season, he made ten times in the Regionalliga.

Utrecht
On 23 May 2018, Arweiler signed a two-year contract with Eredivisie club FC Utrecht, including an option for another two years. He was set to join the reserve team, Jong FC Utrecht. At Jong Utrecht, he made his professional debut in the Eerste Divisie on 17 August 2018 against the Go Ahead Eagles, starting in the 5–0 defeat. In the 2018–19 season, he made a total of 29 appearances in the second tier, in which he scored five goals. 

Arweiler made his debut in the Eredivisie on 23 February 2020 when he came on as a substitute for Jean-Christophe Bahebeck in the 74th minute against FC Twente. Only twelve minutes after coming off the bench, he scored his first goal in the top division to secure a 2–1 win. Until the season was cancelled due to the COVID-19 pandemic in the Netherlands in the 2019–20 season, he made three appearances in the Eredivisie and 26 in the Eerste Divisie for Jong Utrecht, where he scored ten goals.

On 24 August 2020, Arweiler was sent on a one-season loan to Eredivisie rivals ADO Den Haag. For ADO he made 25 appearances in the Eredivisie, as the club suffered relegation to the second tier.

Almere City
Ahead of the 2021–22 season, Arweiler did not return to Utrecht, but moved permanently to second division club Almere City on a three-year deal. In Almere he made 32 league appearances and scored 10 goals.

Austria Klagenfurt
After four seasons in the Netherlands, Arweiler joined Austrian Bundesliga club Austria Klagenfurt on 9 July 2022, signing a two-year contract.

International career
Arweiler is a German youth international, having appeared for his country at under-16 and under-20 level.

Career statistics

References

External links
 
 
 
 

1997 births
Living people
People from Püttlingen
German footballers
Germany youth international footballers
Association football midfielders
Regionalliga players
Eerste Divisie players
Eredivisie players
Borussia Dortmund II players
Jong FC Utrecht players
FC Utrecht players
ADO Den Haag players
Almere City FC players
SK Austria Klagenfurt players
German expatriate sportspeople in the Netherlands
Expatriate footballers in the Netherlands
German expatriate sportspeople in Austria
Expatriate footballers in Austria
Footballers from Saarland